Allen Clifford Elliott (December 25, 1897 – May 6, 1979) was a first baseman in Major League Baseball. Nicknamed "Ace", he played for the Chicago Cubs.

References

External links

1897 births
1979 deaths
Major League Baseball first basemen
Chicago Cubs players
Baseball players from St. Louis